Sensenti is a municipality in the Honduran department of Ocotepeque.

Demographics
At the time of the 2013 Honduras census, Sensenti municipality had a population of 11,453. Of these, 99.11% were Mestizo, 0.53% Indigenous, 0.24% Black or Afro-Honduran and 0.11% White.

References

Municipalities of the Ocotepeque Department